The Up-Standing Sitter is a 1948 Warner Bros. Looney Tunes cartoon, directed by Robert McKimson. The cartoon was released on July 3, 1948, and stars Daffy Duck. All voices are by Mel Blanc.

The title is a play on the expression "up-standing citizen" and on standing being opposite of sitting (a fact which figures into the film's closing gag.) The cartoon was made in Cinecolor when a 1948 strike briefly halted production at Technicolor.

Plot
Daffy Duck, working for a baby-sitting agency, is sent to a farm to sit for a hen who is literally "sitting" on an egg and wants to take a trip. Soon after the hen leaves, the egg hatches, producing a yellow chick whose shape, voice and attitude are similar to that of Henery Hawk.

The chick first calls Daffy "Mother", then "daddy", "cousin", "uncle", etc. When Daffy points out he is not a relative, the chick says he is not supposed to talk to strangers, and runs away with Daffy in hot pursuit of his charge. The chick first simply eludes Daffy, and then begins to torment Daffy with one violent gag after another (anticipating Home Alone by decades).

At one point, Daffy (whose voice is identical to Sylvester's but electronically sped up) invokes a phrase more closely associated with Sylvester's "Sufferin' succotash!"

Another part of the cartoon shows Daffy walking on the wire with an umbrella where the chick is standing.  The chick blows very hard at the umbrella, making Daffy fall into the pigpen, which prompts the baby rooster to say, "Aren't you going to chase me anymore?  Or would you rather be a pig?", surely referencing Bing Crosby's song, "Swinging on a Star".

In the process, Daffy also incurs the wrath of the barnyard's bulldog, especially as many of the chick's gags lead to Daffy crashing into the dog's house, and demolishing it many times over. The film's final joke has Daffy over the dog's knee as he applies a loud and painful spanking to Daffy. Daffy calls his agency and tells them he will have to do his next "sitting" job standing up.

Home media
This cartoon is featured, restored, with the original Cinecolor issue (the first Cinecolor cartoon to be restored) on disc 1 of the Looney Tunes Golden Collection: Volume 5.

See also
 Looney Tunes and Merrie Melodies filmography (1940–1949)
 List of cartoons featuring Daffy Duck

References

External links
 
 

1948 films
1948 short films
1948 comedy films
1948 animated films
1940s American animated films
1940s animated short films
1940s English-language films
1940s Warner Bros. animated short films
Looney Tunes shorts
Cinecolor films
Daffy Duck films
Animated films about chickens
Animated films about children
Animated films about dogs
Animated films set in the United States
Films set on farms
Films set in 1948
Films directed by Robert McKimson
Films scored by Carl Stalling
Warner Bros. Cartoons animated short films